Abdul Malik Isami (1311–?) was a 14th-century Indian historian and court poet. He wrote in Persian language, under the patronage of Ala-ud-Din Bahman Shah, the founder of the Bahmani Sultanate. He is best known for Futuh-us-Salatin (c. 1350), a poetic history of the Muslim conquest of India.

Early life 

Isami was born in 1311, possibly in Delhi. His father's name was 'Izz ul-Din 'Isami. His ancestor Fakhr Malik Isami had migrated from Baghdad to India during the reign of Iltutmish (r. 1211–1236).

In 1327, the Delhi Sultanate ruler Muhammad bin Tughluq decided to move his capital from Delhi to Daulatabad in Deccan region. Several residents of Delhi, including Isami's family, were ordered to move to Daulatabad. His 90-year-old grandfather died during this journey.

In Bahman Shah's service 

At Daulatabad, Isami was appalled with what he perceived as Tughluq's misdeeds and tyranny. At one point, he decided to migrate to Mecca, but he was determined to write a history of Muslim rule in India before leaving the country. He aspired to emulate the famous Persian poet Ferdowsi, who wrote Shahnameh, an epic poem outlining the history of Persia.

Qazi Bahauddin of Daulatabad introduced him to Ala-ud-Din Bahman Shah, who had rebelled against Tughluq. Bahman Shah, who established the independent Bahmani Sultanate in the Deccan region, became Isami's patron. Isami thus became the earliest panegyrist at the Bahmani court.

Under the patronage of Bahman Shah, he started writing Futuh-us-Salatin in 1349. Isami claims to have composed its 12,000 verses in 5 months. According to him, he started writing the book on 10 December 1349, and completed it on 14 May 1350. Nothing is known about Isami's life after this point.

Futuh-us-Salatin 

The Futuh-us-Salatin ("Gifts of the Sultans") is a history of Muslim rule in India until 1349-50. Isami also called it Shahnama-i Hind ("the Shahnameh of India"). According to Isami, his sources included anecdotes, legends, and reports by his friends and acquaintances. Unlike several earlier chronicles, the book's language is devoid of "rhetorical artifices and unpleasant exaggeration".

The book begins with an account of the conquests of the Ghaznavid ruler Mahmud (r. 998–1002) and the Ghurid ruler Muhammad (r. 1173-1202). It then goes on to narrate the history of the Delhi Sultanate until 1349-50. The book also describes the early years of the establishment of the Bahmani Sultanate.

Historical reliability 

Futuh-us-Salatin is written in masnavi (rhyming poem) style, and is not fully reliable for the purposes of history. It contains factual mistakes and omits several important events. In addition, Isami implies that the various historical events were pre-determined by divine will and destiny. He believed that the presence of spiritually powerful Sufi leaders affected the fortunes of a kingdom. For example, he attributes to the decline of the Delhi Sultanate to the death of the Sufi saint Nizamuddin Auliya. Similarly, he claims that the Deccan region prospered because Burhanuddin Gharib and his successor Zainuddin Shirazi lived in Daulatabad.

Isami is highly critical of Muhammad bin Tughluq. On the other hand, he calls his patron Bahman Shah as the rightful caliph. He claims that Tughluq forced the entire population of Delhi to move to Daulatabad, and that only 10% of the migrants survived the journey. Both these claims appear to be exaggerations. According to Isami, this unfortunate situation was a result of God's punishment to the corrupt Muslims.

Despite these defects, Isami's book is a valuable source of information about the political history and social life of 14th century India.

References

Bibliography 

 
 
 
 
 
 
 
 
 

Panegyrists
14th-century Indian historians
Delhi Sultanate
Bahmani Sultanate
14th-century Indian Muslims
14th-century Persian-language writers
Indian male writers
Poets from Delhi
1311 births
Year of death uncertain
Scholars from Delhi
14th-century historians of the medieval Islamic world